Kutlovitsa Glacier is the 9.4 km long and 4.2 km wide glacier in southern Aristotle Mountains on Oscar II Coast in Graham Land, Antarctica situated north of Flask Glacier.  It is draining the southeast slopes of Madrid Dome, and flowing southeastwards along the north slopes of Mount Fedallah to join Belogradchik Glacier.

The feature is named after the settlement of Kutlovitsa in northeastern Bulgaria.

Location
British mapping in 1976.

Maps
 Antarctic Digital Database (ADD). Scale 1:250000 topographic map of Antarctica. Scientific Committee on Antarctic Research (SCAR). Since 1993, regularly upgraded and updated.

References
 Kutlovitsa Glacier. SCAR Composite Antarctic Gazetteer.
 Bulgarian Antarctic Gazetteer. Antarctic Place-names Commission. (details in Bulgarian, basic data in English)

External links
 Kutlovitsa Glacier. Copernix satellite image

Glaciers of Oscar II Coast
Bulgaria and the Antarctic